Vallivattom is a remote village in the Vellangur Panchayat district of Kerala, the southernmost state of India. Its eastern boundary has the Trichur-Kodungallor road.  The town is 13 km (9.6 mi) from Kodungallor and Irinjalakuda.

Vallivattom has five schools, and its literacy rate is 75%.  It is religiously diverse, containing seven mosques, 15 Hindu temples, and 3 churches .  Its primary industries are coir production, Transportation , Retail Shop , Coconut Oil mill.  The primary roads in and around the village are NH 17, the Trichur-Kodungallor Road, the Konathukunnu-Poovathumkadavu Road, the Paingode-Konathukunnu Road, and the Karupadanna-Chirattakkunnu Road.

References

Villages in Thrissur district